Barack Obama: The Story is a book written by David Maraniss on the life of United States President Barack Obama.

The biography was published on June 19, 2012.

References

2012 non-fiction books
Books about Barack Obama
American political books
Simon & Schuster books